is a film directed by Tomu Uchida that was released in 1937.  It received the 1938 Kinema Junpo Award for Best Film.

The protagonist, Tokumaru, is laid off from his corporate job. Unable to accept this, he convinces himself that he has actually been promoted instead. He begins to show up at work, acting like an important man and embarrassing his family and former co-workers.

Cast
 Isamu Kosugi
 Hisako Takihana

References

External links

 Kagirinaki Zenshin at the Japanese Cinema Database.

1930s Japanese-language films
Films directed by Tomu Uchida
Best Film Kinema Junpo Award winners
1937 films
Nikkatsu films
Japanese black-and-white films
Japanese drama films
1937 drama films